Senator Cameron may refer to:

Members of the United States Senate
Angus Cameron (American politician) (1826–1897), U.S. Senator from Wisconsin from 1875 to 1885
J. Donald Cameron (1833–1918), U.S. Senator from Pennsylvania from 1877 to 1897
Ralph H. Cameron (1863–1953), U.S. Senator from Arizona from 1921 to 1927
Simon Cameron (1799–1889), U.S. Senator from Pennsylvania from 1867 to 1877

United States state senate members
Dean Cameron (politician) (born 1961), Idaho State Senate
Howard W. Cameron (1915–1986), Wisconsin State Senate